Mutayr is an Arab tribe that originated in the northern Hejaz near Medina. The tribe mainly inhabits Saudi Arabia (Najd), Kuwait, Iraq, Morocco, and Tunisia.

Genealogy 
Ahmad al-Qalqashandi who died in 1418 stated that al-Mutayr tribe belongs to Ghatafan who are descendants of Ishmael son of Abraham (the father of Arabs). John Gordon Lorimer (1870–1914), an official of the Indian Civil Service and other historians of Mutayr noted that the main branches of Mutayr today are Banu Abdullah, Al-'Ulwa (also spelled 'Llwah), and Braih. DNA Tests for samples taken by male participants belonging to Mutair Tribe has confirmed that they are sharing the same haplogroup, and a common ancestor. Various published studies has referred to results from Mutair Tribe and stated that most of Y-Chromosome Lineage is from the J1 Haplogroup network. Members of Mutair tribe are considered to be one of the first among Arabian tribes to utilize genetic genealogy to study the genealogy of Mutair using most modern and recent technologies. Results of participants are published publicly in a dedicated website named MutirDNA.com and also on a public project in FamilyTreeDNA.

History
Mutayr's original homelands were the highlands of northern Hejaz near Medina. At some point in the 17th century, however, the tribe began a large-scale migration eastwards into central Arabia, displacing many other Bedouin tribes in the area, such as Harb and 'Anizzah who were forced to move northwards after. Mutayr also migrated to North Africa along with Banu Hilal and Banu Sulaym in the 11th century and settled in Morocco and Tunisia. By the 20th century, Mutayr's tribal lands extended from the highlands east of Medina, through the region of Al-Qasim, to the borders of Iraq. A rivalry developed between Mutayr and Harb, who inhabited roughly the same areas as Mutayr, as well as with 'Utaybah, who had just moved into central Arabia from Hejaz.

Because Mutayr were the dominant nomadic tribe of Al-Qaseem, which was the main bone of contention between the clans of Al Saud and Al Rashid vying for control of central Arabia in the early 20th century, Mutayr came to play an important role in the history of Arabia during that era. Mutayr, then, was led by Faisal Al-Dewish, who frequently changed sides in the conflict between the two Saudi Arabian leaders. In 1912, the ruler of Riyadh, Abdul Aziz Ibn Saud undertook to settle the nomads of his realm in newly created villages (hijras), where the bedouins were to be indoctrinated into a puritanical form of Islam and become warriors for Ibn Saud's cause. These new forces were known as the Ikhwan Mn ta'allah ("Brotherhood"), and Faisal Al-Dewish had led the Ikhwan movement enthusiastically, providing Ibn Saud with crucial military support. The most important Mutayri settlement was al-Artawiyya, at the northern edge of the Dahna desert.

In 1920 Al-Dewish led an attack by the Ikhwan on Kuwait at al-Jahra, and were compelled to withdraw once and for all under British pressure. Later, a Mutayri contingent, led by Al-Dewish, joined with other sections of the Ikhwan in the conquest of the Hejaz on behalf of Ibn Saud in 1924. Thereafter, a number of Ikhwan leaders from different tribes, led by Al-Dewish, led a rebellion against Ibn Saud. The Ikhwan sought to take over the newly conquered provinces for themselves and claimed that Ibn Saud had abandoned the true faith by refraining from attacking the European-ruled territories of Iraq and Syria. Ibn Saud, however, defeated the rebels at the Battle of Sabilla in northeastern Nejd, and Al-Dewish sought with the British in Iraq. The British, however, handed him over to Ibn Saud. Al-Dewish was put in prison, and died not long afterwards.

The tribe has historically been mostly bedouin, with only a few representatives among the settled families of Arabia at the turn of the 20th century. Today, however, nearly all members of the tribe are settled in the cities and towns of Saudi Arabia, making up to 400 villages across the country and especially Riyadh, Medina and central region of the country. A large section of the tribe also settled in Iraq and Kuwait.

Notable people

Among the tribe's members are: 

 Jahz bin Sharar Al-Maimouni
 Faisal bin Watban Al-Dawish, helped Ibrahim Pasha overthrow the first Saudi state and later rebelled against him
 Faisal bin Suqyan, one of Mutair's famous knights
 Watban Al-Dawish, one of the sheikhs of the famous Mutair tribe
 Sultan Al-Duwaish, father of Faisal Al-Duwaish, leader of the Ikhwan movement, participated in the Battle of Al-Sarif alongside Mubarak Al-Sabah
 Faisal al-Duwaish, one of the leaders of the Ikhwan movement
 Adah Almutairi, Saudi scientist, inventor and businesswoman and one of Forbes top ten most influential female engineers in the world
 Hind al-Mutayri, Saudi poet, writer and academic
 Helal Al-Mutairi, Kuwaiti businessman 
 Khalid Al-Nafisi, Kuwaiti actor

See also
Al-Mutairi, list of people with this name
Bedouin
Ikhwan
Ghatafan

References

Tribes of Arabia
Tribes of Saudi Arabia
Tribes of Iraq
Tribes of Kuwait
Arab tribes in Morocco
Arab groups
Bedouin groups
Ghatafan
History of the Arabian Peninsula